Starksia posthon, the brown-spotted blenny, is a species of labrisomid blenny native to the Pacific coast of Central America from Costa Rica to Panama.  It inhabits sandy areas with weed growth in shallow waters.  This species can reach a length of  TL.

References

posthon
Fish described in 1971
Taxa named by Richard Heinrich Rosenblatt